Canadian-Scottish regiments are regiments in the Canadian Army that maintain the traditions and style of dress used by Scottish regiments.  Although these units maintain Scottish dress and traditions, recruitment for these units is open to all Canadians.

The Canadian Army maintains sixteen Canadian-Scottish infantry regiments, and one Canadian-Scottish artillery regiment. All Canadian-Scottish infantry regiments form a part of the Canadian Army Reserve. In addition to active units, there also exists one Canadian-Scottish regiment in the Canadian Army's Supplementary Order of Battle.

Current regiments

The Royal Regiment of Canadian Artillery

42nd Field Regiment (Lanark and Renfrew Scottish), RCA

Royal Canadian Infantry Corps

Units are listed in order of precedence:

The Black Watch (Royal Highland Regiment) of Canada
The Royal Highland Fusiliers of Canada
The Lorne Scots (Peel, Dufferin and Halton Regiment)
Stormont, Dundas and Glengarry Highlanders
The Nova Scotia Highlanders
The Cameron Highlanders of Ottawa (Duke of Edinburgh's Own)
The Essex and Kent Scottish
48th Highlanders of Canada
The Cape Breton Highlanders
The Argyll and Sutherland Highlanders of Canada (Princess Louise's)
The Lake Superior Scottish Regiment
Queen's Own Cameron Highlanders of Canada
The Calgary Highlanders
The Seaforth Highlanders of Canada
The Canadian Scottish Regiment (Princess Mary's)
The Toronto Scottish Regiment (Queen Elizabeth the Queen Mother's Own)

Supplementary Order of Battle
The Perth Regiment

Former regiments

Cavalry 

 13th Scottish Light Dragoons (1866–1936)

Infantry 
Units are listed in order of precedence:

 The Argyll Light Infantry (1863–1954)
 The Lorne Rifles (Scottish) (1866–1936)
 The Essex Scottish Regiment (1885–1954)
 The Highland Light Infantry of Canada (1886–1954, 1957–1965)
 The Lanark and Renfrew Scottish Regiment (1866–1946, 1959–1992)
50th Regiment (Gordon Highlanders of Canada) (1913–1920)
 The New Brunswick Scottish (1946–1954)
 The Pictou Highlanders (1871–1954)
 The North Nova Scotia Highlanders (1936–1954)
 The Prince Edward Island Highlanders (1875–1946)
 The Cumberland Highlanders (1871–1936)
 The Scots Fusiliers of Canada (1914–1965)

See also
 Canadian pipers in World War I
 History of the Canadian Army
 Scottish Canadians

References 

 Barnes, RM, The Uniforms and History of the Scottish Regiments, London, Sphere Books Limited, 1972.

Military history of Canada
Military units and formations of Canada
Highland & Scottish regiments of Canada
Regiments of Canada
Scottish regiments
Highland regiments